Taça de Prata may refer to these Brazilian football trophies:
 Torneio Roberto Gomes Pedrosa (1967–1970)
 Campeonato Brasileiro Série B (since 1971)